Lasse Kalevi Oksanen (born December 7, 1942) is a retired professional ice hockey player who mostly played in the SM-liiga. He played for Ilves.  He was inducted into the Finnish Hockey Hall of Fame in 1987.

Oksanen played 23 years as a professional ice hockey player and ended his career in 1983 with the First Division team KOOVEE.

International Play
Oksanen had a long career with the Finnish National team, playing 282 games for his country.

References

External links

1942 births
Asiago Hockey 1935 players
Finnish ice hockey right wingers
HC Gardena players
Ice hockey players at the 1964 Winter Olympics
Ice hockey players at the 1968 Winter Olympics
Ice hockey players at the 1972 Winter Olympics
Ilves players
KOOVEE players
Living people
Olympic ice hockey players of Finland
Ice hockey people from Tampere
Finnish expatriate ice hockey players in Italy
Ice hockey players with retired numbers
IIHF Hall of Fame inductees